is a private university in Sōka, Saitama, Japan, which is a liberal, co-educational institution noted for its language education programs and international exchanges. The university was founded in 1964, its roots can be traced back as early as 1881. Undergraduate admissions are selective, with an admission rate ranging from 30–40%.

History 
What was to become today's Dokkyo University was founded on 18 September 1881 by various people, among them scholars Nishi Amane and Katō Hiroyuki, diplomats Inoue Kaoru and Aoki Shūzō and statesmen Shinagawa Yajirō and Katsura Tarō as Verein für deutsche Wissenschaften, or  The first chancellor was Prince Kitashirakawa Yoshihisa.

They also founded a highly prestigious law school to study Japan's first constitution The Constitution of the Great Empire of Japan, modeled after the Prussian one with criminal codes also modeled after the German ones, but the elite law division was absorbed by the Imperial University of Tokyo Faculty of Law in 1895.

The school went through a minor negative campaign due to World War I, when Japan sided with the British Empire against the German Empire from August 1914 to November 1918, but the majority of the Japanese public was either pro-German or neutral despite Japan's position in the Anglo-Japanese Alliance. The 1920s saw its heyday when the school sent the highest number of boys into the nation's top  ("High School No.1") in Tokyo, popularly known as "Ichikō", which is today's Liberal Arts campus of the University of Tokyo. The collapse of the two great empires of Germany and Japan in 1945, however, rendered the elite school into a mere boys' high school of middle rank.

During the early 1960s Dokkyo School's graduate and former Education Minister  was invited to found the University with money from the school and local governments. They started their first lectures on a higher education level in April 1964.

Facilities 
The university is located in Sōka, Saitama, around 30 minutes from the Tokyo Metropolitan area. The facilities are arranged on a campus-styled property and include the Central, East and West buildings, a Student Center, Library and Research Center, a University Sports Ground and various gardens and additional buildings.

The campus is situated next to the Denu river and can be accessed via the East, West, South or Ground Gate.

The Teiyu Amano Memorial Stadium, home of the university's baseball team, is located off-campus in Koshigaya.

Academics

Schools 
Dokkyo Medical University

Undergraduate

Faculty of Foreign languages
Department of German
Department of English
Department of French
Faculty of International Liberal Arts
Department of Interdisciplinary Studies
Faculty of Economics
Department of Economics
Department of Management science
Faculty of Law
Department of Law
Department of International Legal Studies
Department of Policy studies (since 2008)

Postgraduate

Graduate schools
Graduate School of Law
Graduate School of Foreign Languages
Graduate School of Economics
Dokkyo Law School

International exchanges 
The university has an International Center, an overseas study program and various exchange agreements with universities worldwide. It also offers a Japanese Language and Culture Program for exchange students.

Exchange agreements
The university maintains student and academic exchange programs with various national and international universities.

Rankings 

In 2018 Dokkyo University was ranked among the top 100 universities in Japan (86th) by Times Higher Education (THE).

Student life

Athletics 

Dokkyo offers a variety of athletic programs. The university's baseball team has been competing in the Tokyo Metropolitan Area University Baseball League since 1967.

People

Alumni 
Notable alumni from Dokkyo university include:

Jun Enomoto, Japanese football player
Rie Furuse, Japanese singer
Katsuko Nishimoto, Japanese politician
Atsuko Okamoto, Japanese actress
Koichiro Okuma, Japanese martial artist
Tomorowo Taguchi, Japanese actor
Sōichirō Takashima, Japanese politician
Toru Toida, Japanese politician
Yumi Yoshiyuki, Japanese film director

See also
 Dokkyodaigakumae Station
 Dokkyo Medical University
 Himeji Dokkyo University

External links

References 

Private universities and colleges in Japan
Educational institutions established in 1964
Universities and colleges in Saitama Prefecture
1964 establishments in Japan